The Union of Shop, Distributive and Allied Workers (Usdaw) is a trade union in the United Kingdom, consisting of around 360,000 members. Usdaw members work in a variety of occupations and industries including: shopworkers, factory and warehouse workers, drivers, call centres, clerical workers, milkround and dairy process, butchers and meat packers, catering, laundries, chemical processing, home shopping and pharmaceutical. The retail sector employs around 2.77 million people.

Usdaw launched shocking statistics from their 2022 annual survey of over 7,700 retail staff showing that nearly a third (30%) are considering changing their job and over four-in-ten (41%) feel anxious about work, all because of high levels of verbal abuse, threats and assaults. The survey also found the number of incidents has come down since the exceptionally high levels during the pandemic, but remain higher than pre-Covid levels in 2019. The full report can be found at: 

Usdaw relies upon a "partnership" model with large employers such as with Tesco, where there exist "privileged access" to the management of both organisations. This arrangement coupled with its actions has been met with criticism, such as where the union seemingly presents itself as being concerned more with maintaining its positive, comfortable position and easy membership supply than that of fair representation of its members. This attitude has earned the union the pejorative backronym of Useless Seven Days A Week amongst workers and trade unionists.

It is widely considered to be on the right-wing on the political spectrum,  occupying the "politically conservative" section of the Labour Party.

In November 2021, the union was criticised at its refusal to negotiate with a Nottingham-based employer who was proposing a 'fire-and-rehire' policy leaving to workers having to negotiate for themselves.

Usdaw is campaigning to win a “New Deal for Workers”: A minimum wage that workers can actually live on; secure hours and an end to zero hours contracts; sick pay for everyone, from day one of illness; stronger redundancy rights; fairness, equality and a stronger voice at work.

Usdaw’s annual Respect for Shopworkers Week usually takes place mid-November and runs from 14th to 20th in 2022. During the campaign week Usdaw members are raising awareness of the union’s year-round Freedom from Fear Campaign, talking to the public to promote a message of ‘respect for shopworkers’.

History
The union was formed in 1947 by the merger of the National Union of Distributive and Allied Workers and the National Union of Shop Assistants, Warehousemen and Clerks.  Some other unions have since merged in, including the Amalgamated Society of Boot and Shoe Makers and Repairers in 1955, and the Scottish Union of Bakers and Allied Workers in 1978.

Publications
USDAW produces a quarterly membership magazine for members, Arena, as well as a bimonthly magazine for union activists, Network.

General Secretaries
Since 1947, USDAW has had eight General Secretaries:
1947: Sir Joseph Hallsworth
1949: Sir Alan Birch
1962: Lord Allen of Fallowfield
1979: Bill Whatley
1986: Lord Davies of Coity
1997: Sir William Connor
2004: John Hannett
2018: Paddy Lillis

Presidents
Since 1947, USDAW has had eleven General Secretaries:
1947: Percy Cottrell
1948: Walter Padley
1964: Dick Seabrook
1965: Rodney Haines
1967: Dick Seabrook
1974: Jim D. Hughes
1977: Sydney Tierney
1991: Audrey Wise
1997: Marge Carey, MBE
2006: Jeff Broome
2018: Amy Murphy
2021: Jane Jones

References

External links

Trade unions in the United Kingdom
1947 establishments in the United Kingdom
Trade unions established in 1947
Retail trade unions
Food processing trade unions
Food processing industry in the United Kingdom
Trade unions affiliated with the Labour Party (UK)
Trade unions based in Greater Manchester
Trade unions affiliated with the Trades Union Congress